The 2020 All-Ireland Senior Camogie Championship Final, the 89th event of its kind and the culmination of the 2020 All-Ireland Senior Camogie Championship, was played at Croke Park in Dublin on 12 December 2020.

Kilkenny won their 14th title after defeating Galway by 1-14 to 1-11.

Details

References

1
All-Ireland Senior Camogie Championship Finals
camogie
Ladies' All-Ireland Championship
All-Ireland Senior Camogie Championship Final, 2020